The New England Quilt Museum, founded in 1987, is located in downtown Lowell, Massachusetts and is the only institute in the Northeast solely dedicated to the art and craft of quilting. It is the second-oldest quilt museum in the United States. It houses special and permanent exhibits, a library, a museum shop, and classrooms. Collections are strong in 19th century quilts, with a geographic focus on New England.

History
The museum opened in 1987, and was founded and staffed by quiltmakers. It has been since its start committed to both craft and fine arts quilts, with exhibits and classes incorporating contemporary as well as traditional fiber arts approaches.

The museum moved into its current space in 1994, after a flood in its previous building. The new space, the historic Lowell Institute for Savings building, gave the museum more room for exhibits, collection storage and preparation, classrooms, a museum shop, and events. It is now part of the Lowell National Historical Park, which highlights Lowell's centrality to the 19th century textile trade and Industrial Revolution in the United States.

Activities
In 2000, the museum founded the Lowell Quilt Festival, which has expanded to involve multiple partners across the city and region. IMAGES, a top juried show that began in 1983, is also part of the festival; entries are from across the United States and Canada. The Lowell Quilt Festival was held for the last time in 2014.

MassQuilts, a volunteer-led statewide project to document the history of quilts, holds sessions at the museum the second Thursday of every month. The organization was started in 1994, and has documented more than 7,000 quilts. MassQuilts has also developed traveling shows, exhibits for the museum, and Massachusetts Quilts, Our Common Wealth a university press book on the history of Massachusetts quilts and exhibits for the museum.

See also
 American Textile History Museum
 Lowell National Historical Park

References

Further reading

 Gilbert, Jennifer. (1999). The New England Quilt Museum quilts: Featuring the story of the mill girls : instructions for five heirloom quilts. Lafayette, Calif: C & T Pub. 

Museums established in 1987
Museums in Lowell, Massachusetts
Quilt museums in the United States
Folk art museums and galleries in Massachusetts
1987 establishments in Massachusetts